The Napier-Campbell Blue Bird was a land speed record car driven by Malcolm Campbell. Its designer was C. Amherst Villiers and Campbell's regular mechanic Leo Villa supervised its construction.

This was Campbell's first car to use the Napier Lion aero engine. His intention was to surpass his previous Sunbeam Blue Bird's achievement of the 150 mph barrier and to reach 200 mph.

1927 

When first built, the car used a Napier Lion engine of around 500 bhp. It was of conventional form with a front-mounted vertical radiator and the driver behind the engine. The three banks of the W-12 engine were hidden behind bulges in the narrow bonnet, with exhaust stub pipes protruding.

Bluebird's first record attempt was on 4 February 1927 at Pendine Sands.

1928

The 1927 record was short-lived, as Segrave's Sunbeam 1000 hp achieved both the 180 mph and 200 mph targets a month later. This prompted Campbell to rebuild the car as "Blue Bird III"  for 1928.

Improved aerodynamics were innovatively tested in Vickers' wind-tunnel by R.K. Pierson, their Chief Designer. Blue Bird’s body shape was substantially changed, with the famous coachbuilders Mulliner producing the bodywork. The results were unorthodox. A vertical tail fin was added for stability, a first for Blue Bird and land speed record cars. Open spats behind the wheels also reduced drag. The biggest change was to the radiators, which were moved to the rear of the car and mounted externally. These surface radiators were made by Fairey Aviation and contained  of tube. Removing the nose radiator allowed a low, rounded nose with better streamlining. However, one French newspaper compared its looks to a whale.

Once again though he only held the record for a couple of months, losing it by a whisker to Ray Keech and the White Triplex.

1929
Campbell sought a more predictable venue than a tidal beach, so he set off to survey possible sites by air. Africa showed promise, first at a site 600 miles from Timbuctu and so impractically inaccessible. A dry lake bed in South Africa, the Verneukpan, was still  from Cape Town, but did have some chance of access.

Blue Bird was rebuilt for a third time. The chassis, engine and drivetrain remained the same, but the bodywork was replaced with one built in Dumfries by Arrol-Aster. This body was lower, requiring a hump around the cockpit where Campbell now sat astride the gearbox. The surface radiators were replaced by a conventional circular nose opening, covered by a distinctive "birdcage" grille.

Unfortunately, after a period of five years of no rainfall, it poured down almost as soon as they arrived.

After Segrave had raised the record in Golden Arrow by a whole  though, Campbell knew that Blue Bird was beaten and began work on a new car, the Campbell-Napier-Railton Blue Bird.

References 

  Many rare period photos.

Bibliography

Bluebird record-breaking vehicles
Bluebird,Napier-Campbell Bluebird
Bluebird,Napier-Campbell Bluebird
Cars powered by aircraft engines